Renukeshwar Mahadev Temple is situated in Renukoot in Sonbhadra district, Uttar Pradesh. It is located adjoining the Rihand River which is also called Renu River, from where this temple got its name. The temple is dedicated to Mahadev or Lord Shiva. The temple was built by Birla Group in the year 1972.

Attractions
The main entrance features a carving that presents Sun god on the chariot. The second gate presents stone carvings of elephants at either side. The temple grounds include garden fountains.

References
 http://www.transindiatravels.com/birla-mandirs.html

Buildings and structures in Sonbhadra district
Hindu temples in Uttar Pradesh
Tourist attractions in Sonbhadra district
Renukoot